Little Junior is a Canadian rock band from Toronto.

Background 

The group formed after being members of the band Dangerband. Brothers Rane and Chai, Jackson Beyer and Lucas Meilach-Boston split their time between Montreal and Toronto while attending university. The band formed formally in 2014.

Hi 

The band's first full-length album titled Hi was released in 2018 with Royal Mountain Records. The band followed the album release with a tour of the United States and Canada. One of the songs of the album was a cover of the song I Really Like You by Carly Rae Jepsen. The accompanying music video for the song was a shot-for-shot remake. the video was directed by Max Parr. Many of the songs on the album had to do with LGBTQ+ and Queer themes.

The band toured with and opened up for Hollerado in 2019 on multiple dates.

Second studio album and lineup change 

The band began work on their second album in 2019. Lucas Meilach-Boston was replaced by Zoe G. (formerly of Bueller) on guitar. In 2020 during the COVID-19 pandemic in Toronto the band signed a petition amongst other musicians against homeless encampment evictions.

Discography  
 2018 - Hi - LP

References 

Musical groups from Toronto
Musical groups established in 2014
2014 establishments in Ontario